Legends of Warriors is a 2020 Burmese military-drama television series. This series is a tribute to the 75th Myanmar Armed Forces Day. It aired on MRTV-4 at 20:45 for 13 episodes.

Cast
Zin Wine as Chief strategist
 Ye Aung as U Thaung Tan
 Yan Kyaw as U Phay Khin
Tyron Bejay as Phay Khin, young life of U Phay Khin
 Khant Sithu as Captain Myint Lwin
 Aung Yay Chan as Major Ye Win
 Kyaw Hsu as Sergeant Thet Lwin
 Thi Ha as Captain Oakkar
 Nay Myo Aung as Lieutenant Kyaw Yin
 Min Htet Kyaw Zin as Pilot Major Myint Thein
 Min Yazar as Sergeant Myo Aye
 Soe Myat Thuzar as Daw Hla Myint
 May Thinzar Oo as Daw Aye Hla
May Myint Mo as Dr. Yee Mon
 Yin Let as Nurse Naw Lay Phaw
 Khaing Thazin Ngu Wah as Sergeant Aye Mya Thu

References

Burmese television series
MRTV (TV network) original programming
Myawaddy TV original programming